Ndue Ukaj is an Albanian writer, publicist, literary critic

Biography 
Ndue Ukaj studied Literature at the University of Pristina. He is the former Editor of the "Identiteti, a magazine of art, culture, and society (2000–2001), published in Pristina.

He is a regular contributor to the daily press in Albania, Kosovo, North Macedonia and Montenegro. He has written articles about literature and critical essays, some of which have been published in translation. 
His poems and texts are translated into English, Romanian, Spanish, Italian, Finnish, Swedish, Turkish, and Chinese.
PRIZES:

He has written four books, including "Godo is not coming", which won the national award "Azem Shkreli" for best book of poetry published in 2010 in Kosovo.

He has also won the award for best poem in the International Poetry Festival in North Macedonia "Days of Naim".
 
PRIZES 2013: The International Best Poets, Translators, Critics,
and Poetry Magazines, Selections of Poems, IPTRC'

"Creativity prize" from Naaman’s Literary Prizes 2016.
Ukaj is a member of the Swedish PEN

Works

Books in Albanian
"The Biblical Discourse in the Albanian Literature", AIKD; Kosovë 2004.
"The Waterfall of Metaphors", M&B, Albania, 2008
"Arka e shpëtimit", Drita, Kosovë, 2012
"Gjithmonë diçka mungon", OM,Kosovë, 2017.
"Krijimi i dashurisë", përzgjedhje poetike, botuar nga Festivali Ndërkombëtar i Poezisë "Ditët e Naimit", 2017, Tetovë.
"Ismail Kadare: Kryqëzime leteare dhe kulturore", Onufri, 2019.
"Mbretëria e ëndrrave", Onufri, 2021.
"Retë prej drite", Onufri 2022.

Books in English
"Ithaca of the Word", translated by Peter Tase, publishing by Lulu Enterprises, USA 2010
"Godo is Not Coming" translated by Peter Tase, Lulu Enterprises, USA 2010

Book in Spanish
"Godo no viene",translated by Peter Tase, Lulu Enterpress, USA, 2010.

References 

https://foreignpolicynews.org/2014/05/06/ndue-ukaj-visionary-writer-kosovo/

https://www.eurasiareview.com/24042013-return-to-the-core-of-neo-european-aspiration-review/

Living people
Year of birth missing (living people)